Mary Agnes Yerkes, (August 9, 1886 – November 8, 1989), was an American Impressionist painter, photographer and artisan. She was skilled in the media of oil, pastel and watercolor. Her professional career was cut short by the Great Depression, but she still continued to paint well into her nineties with a passion for her craft and nature. She is noted for her plein-air painting while camping the American West and its National Parks.

Early life in Chicago

Mary Agnes Yerkes was born on August 9, 1886, in Oak Park, Illinois. Her parents, Charles Sherman Yerkes and Mary Greenlees Yerkes, had moved to their North Grove Avenue home a few years earlier from Ohio. She was the third child of four siblings; Reuben Archibald, Alice Agnew, and Charles Greenlees. Mary Agnes graduated from Oak Park and River Forest High School in 1906, and became an accomplished local artist.

Her father died in 1908. In 1913, her mother commissioned a house, the Mary Greenlees Yerkes Residence from architect John S. Van Bergen. Van Bergen was a draftsman and then a contemporary of Frank Lloyd Wright. Where most architects catered to wealthy clients, Van Bergen showed a particular interest in designing for both career women and artists. Their home was specifically designed by Van Bergen with an upstairs art studio for Mary Agnes. He even designed some of the first floor's interior trim in to frame some of Mary Agnes' mural paintings.

The Mary Greenlees Yerkes Residence is an Oak Park Preservation Trust award recipient. The Art Institute of Chicago and listings within Oak Park directories show her living at this 450 Iowa address from 1913 to 1919. Her mother continued living with Mary Agnes until her death in California, in 1935.

Yerkes took a two-year course in art history and decorative design at Rockford College. She then studied at the Academy of Fine Arts, where she also taught, and at the currently named School of the Art Institute of Chicago. She had special painting instruction under Wellington Reynolds, John W. Norton and Walter Marshall Clute, and participated in numerous exhibitions, including the exhibits of Chicago Artists, and the American Watercolor Society at the Art Institute of Chicago from 1912 to 1915.

Yerkes had a solo two-week showing in October 1915, about which a Chicago critic wrote:

California and the Depression

"It was..California, and more specifically San Francisco, that became the first mecca for women artists in the West". 

In 1917, she married Navy Commander Archibald Nelson Offley, (Archie), and had one child, Mary Yerkes Offley, born in 1918 and who died at the age of 15 from nephritis. The early married life to a naval officer found her transferred to several ports: Portsmouth, Virginia, in the East, and San Diego, Vallejo, Long Beach, and San Francisco, along the coast of California. They eventually took up permanent residence in San Mateo, California, in the 1930s. This time period saw the onset of the Great Depression and she realized that a formal career in painting would be difficult: "The Great Depression of the 1930s and the consequent lack of funds to patronize art severely affected the careers of many artists, both men and women." A few artists during this time were lucky to find jobs through the Works Progress Administration's Federal Art Project in painting murals in public buildings, but for many artists their careers were crushed. This situation was confirmed by Yerkes' own journal, on one weekend's journey to San Francisco from San Mateo in 1935. Yerkes had an appointment with the art director of Gump's Department Store. She left very discouraged because the director said "nobody is buying art during these times". Their lifestyle was modest but far better than most  during this period with Offley's secure position at the Office of Censorship in the Navy.  Any free time and saved money went for putting gas in the car, to roam the countryside for her artistic exploration.

Plein-air and the National Parks

Yerkes mostly painted en plein-air but she also worked at home in a studio. Numerous photographs were taken by her on each trip to be used as reference later. Archie died in 1945 and Yerkes' painting efforts took a pause. They resumed in the 1950s with encouragement from her second partner, Albert Cobb, although she did not remarry. Yerkes continued to camp and paint the American West well into the 1970s and into her nineties. She also hooked pictorial rugs, wove fabric for her own clothes and accessories, and carved furniture in the same Southwestern and natural motifs she loved to paint. She died in San Mateo on November 8, 1989, at the age of 103.  After decades of painting, over [150] of her paintings adorned her own walls at the time of her death. The art world knows her as "Mary Agnes" Yerkes but she, as well as her family members, used "Agnes".

Gallery

Signature styles
"Although many rejected the Victorian role for women, few divorced themselves completely from its influence ... And frequently they signed their works with monograms ..."

References

External links
 Smithsonian American Art Inventories - Mary Agnes Yerkes.
Illinois Women Artists Project - Mary Agnes Yerkes.
AskArt - Mary Agnes Yerkes.

20th-century American painters
American landscape painters
American women painters
American Impressionist painters
Painters from Illinois
Painters from California
1886 births
1989 deaths
American centenarians
Artists of the American West
20th-century American women artists
Women centenarians